Stormvarning (Gale Warning) is the sixth studio album from Swedish singer/songwriter Ted Gärdestad, released on the Polar Music label in Sweden in early 1981. Stormvarning was an expanded and partly re-recorded version of the international album I'd Rather Write a Symphony, released in West Germany and the Netherlands in 1980.

The album includes a solo version of the 1980 Melodifestivalen entry "Låt Solen Värma Dig", originally a duet with Rock De Luxe vocalist Annica Boller, Gärdestad's girlfriend at the time. The duet version remains unreleased on CD.

The Stormvarning album also features the track that was to be Gärdestad's final hit single of the eighties, "Låt Kärleken Slå Rot", produced by Benny Andersson and featuring Anni-Frid Lyngstad on vocals.

Track listing
All lyrics written by Kenneth Gärdestad, music by Ted Gärdestad

Side A:
"Låt Kärleken Slå Rot" - 4:48 
"Stormvarning!" ("Mindblower") - 4:23 
"Don't Treat Me This Way" - 3:27 
"Slingan"  - 1:51 
"You Got Me Dancing" - 4:04 
"The Reason" - 4:43

Side B: 
"Ingen Annan Än Du"  - 3:30 
"Låt Solen Värma Dig" (Solo version) - 3:33 
"How Do You Wanna Make Love" - 3:25 
"It's You" - 5:21 
"Down at the Zoo" (Alternate version) - 3:55 
"Orättvisan" - 3:57

Personnel
 Ted Gärdestad - lead vocals, acoustic guitar, piano, keyboards, cymbals, strata
 Benny Andersson - synthesizers, piano, keyboards ("Låt Kärleken Slå Rot")
 Janne Schaffer - guitars
 Lasse Wellander - guitars
 Kjell Öhman - piano
 Björn J:son Lindh - piano, string arrangements
 Per-Erik Hallin - piano
 Wlodek Gulgowski - piano
 Rutger Gunnarsson - bass guitar
 Stefan Brolund - bass guitar
 Mike Watson - bass guitar
 Sam Bengtsson - bass guitar
 Åke Sundqvist - drums
 Per Lindvall - drums
 Ola Brunkert - drums
 Lennart Östlund - strata
 Ulf Andersson - saxophone
 Tomas Ledin - backing vocals
 Mikael Rickfors - backing vocals
 Annica Boller - backing vocals
 Diana Nunez - backing vocals
 Maritza Horn - backing vocals
 Liza Öhman - backing vocals
 Py Bäckman - backing vocals
 Agneta Olsson - backing vocals
 Lasse Westman - backing vocals
 Anni-Frid Lyngstad - backing vocals ("Låt Kärleken Slå Rot")
 Lennart Sjödin - backing vocals ("Låt Kärleken Slå Rot")

Production
 Ted Gärdestad - producer
 Lennart Östlund - producer
 Benny Andersson - producer ("Låt Kärleken Slå Rot")
 Michael B. Tretow - producer ("Orättvisan")
 Leif Mases - sound engineer
 Lennart Östlund - sound engineer
 Recorded at Polar Studios, Stockholm
 Originally released as Polar POLS 310, 1981

Charts

References

Other sources and external links
 Official home page, The Ted Gärdestad Society
Liner notes Stormvarning, Ted Gärdestad, Polar Music POLS 310, 1981.
[ Allmusic.com entry, Stormvarning, Ted Gärdestad, 1981]

1981 albums
Ted Gärdestad albums